John Palmer (1959) is a British composer, pianist and musicologist.

John Palmer began his music career as a pianist and keyboard player in the mid-seventies. In the 1980s he studied piano with Grazia Wendling and Eva Serman at the Lucerne School of Music (Musikhochschule Luzern), Switzerland, while attending courses in composition with Edison Denisov and Vinko Globokar.  He continued his composition studies in London at Trinity College of Music, Royal Holloway, University of London and at City University London where he obtained a PhD in composition in 1994. Further studies include composition with Vinko Globokar at the Dartington Summer School and privately with Jonathan Harvey, analysis with Jonathan Cross at the University of Bristol, and conducting with Alan Hazeldine at the Guildhall School of Music And Drama in London.
Since 1987 Palmer's works has focused on orchestral, instrumental, vocal, chamber music, and electroacoustic composition.

Selected works

Opera 
Re di Donne (2019) Chamber Opera in One Act, for 4 singers and ensemble with electronics

Orchestra 
Omen' (1991) for orchestra and choirThere (1992, rev. 2019) for string orchestra with string quartet
Concertino (1994)
Hypothetical Questions (1992 rev. 2011)
Piano Concerto (2005) for piano (tuned microtonally), orchestra and choir
Double Concerto for Violin and Cello (2016)
Not Two (2017) for orchestra

 Ensemble 
Asgard (1987- rev. 2001) for 2 speakers and ensemble (fl, cl, vl, vla, vc, pno, electronics)
Koan (1999) for shakuhachi and ensemble (fl, ob, clar, perc, pno, vl, vla, vc)
Waka (2003) for percussion and ensemble (fl, ob, cl, pno, vl, vla, vc)
Legend (2008)  for  harp and ensemble
You (2008) for trombone and ensemble
Transparence (2015) for viola and ensemble with electronics
Blurring definitions (2016) fl, cl, bs, perc, 2 vl, vla, vc, db

 Chamber music 
First String Quartet (1986)
Utopia (1989) soprano and wind quartet
Hellawes (1991) flute trio
Theorem (1995) violin, cello, piano
Second String Quartet  (dream) (1996)
Encounter (1998) harpsichord, world percussion, electronics
Between (2000) violin and harpsichord
Transitions (2000) violin, clarinet, cello, piano
Still (2001) bass flute, 6 & 12-string guitar, viola
Nowhere (2003) clarinet, piano, electronics
Afterglow (2006) alto flute, piano, electronics
Transference (2010)  flute, clarinet, violin, cello and piano
Crossing dialogues (2013)  violin, cello, vibraphone and piano
Of Shadows Unveiled (2013)  flute, bass clarinet and piano
Towards the soul (2015)  trombone quartet
Conditional action (2016)  two flutes
Alba (2016)  violin, viola, cello, piano

 Instrumental 
Hieroglyphs (1985–86) piano
Three Preludes (1987) piano
Poem for the Absurd (1987) piano
Musica Reservata (1989) piano
Shambhala (1990) piano
Satori (1999) harpsichord
Hinayana (1999) oboe
Mosaic (1998) harpsichord
Drang (1999) accordion
Without (2004) violin
Almost (2006) cello
Over (2006) violin
En avant (2006) piano
Se potessi (2011) piano
Eulogy (2013) piano
Verso l’alto (2014) viola
Three Haikus (2014) shakuhachi
Hypothesis (2017) percussion
Yahari (2017) guitar

 Electroacoustic (including acousmatic) 
Beyond the bridge (1993) cello and electronics
Renge-kyo (1993) piano and electronics
Encounter (1998) harpsichord, world percussions, electronics
'...as it flies...' (2001) tape
Transfiguration (1999–2006) trombone and electronics
I am (2002) tape
After silence 1 (2005) piano and electronics
Inwards (2005–06) bass flute and electronics
In the Temple (2006–07) tape
Present Otherness (2008) tape
Mémoires (2011) tape
Woanders (2016) piano and electronics

 Awards 
1990 - Cornelius Cardew Competition, England: special mention for in memory of a friend, for soprano and piano.
1992 - City of Lucerne Cultural Prize, Switzerland: first prize winner with Omen, for orchestra and choir.
1994 - Bourges International Competition for Electroacoustic Music, France: second prize winner with Beyond the Bridge, for cello & electronics.
1995 - Surrey Sinfonietta Orchestral Competition Contest, England: first prize winner with Concertino, for orchestra.
1995 - 1st Tokyo International Competition for Chamber Music Composition: second prize winner with Theorem (piano trio).
1996 - City of Klagenfurt International Composition Prize, Austria: second prize winner with Second String Quartet (Dream).
2009 - Bourges International Competition for Electroacoustic Music, France: selection of Transient for soprano, prepared piano & electronics.
2010 - Città di Udine International Competition for Composers, Italy: Special Mention and Medal of the President of the Italian Republic for Transference, for flute, clarinet, violin, cello and piano.
2011 - Presque Rien International Competition Prize, Paris: prize winner with  mémoires, for electroacoustic sounds.

Recordings
In the Temple - Animato Records ACD6144.
I Am - Animato Records ACD6143. 
Musica Reservata - Animato Records ACD6136. Animato Records
Beyond The Bridge in Edition Memnosyne, Synthese 8, LD278058/59. mnemosyne label
Phonai in Electroshock, 2 ELCD 006. electroshock label
Epitaph in Electroshock, 3 ELCD 007. electroshock label
Theorem in Living Artists Recordings, Vol.3. living artists label
Present Otherness in  Sargasso SCD 28057
Beyond The Bridge, Phonai, Renge-Kyo, Spirits, Vision. Sargasso SCD 28023
Encounter, Hinayana, Epitaph, Between. Sargasso SCD 28038
Koan, Still, Satori. Sargasso SCD 28049
Waka, '...as it flies...''', Nowhere. Sargasso SCD 28053
Inwards, Drang, Transient, Tranfiguration, Fado. Sargasso SCD 28059
 Without in Dots/Lines, Takao Hyakutome (2015)
 Verso L’Alto in 20 Jahre Ensemble Plus, ORF Voralberg CD Label, 2016. (Limited Edition).
 Mémoires in Presque Rien Competition Prize CD Label, Vol. I, Paris 2017. (Limited Edition).

Bibliography
Books:

Looking Within: The Music of John Palmer - Dialogues and Essays, edited by Sunny Knable (2021). Vision Edition, ISBN 978-0-9931761-7-3.

Mortuos Plango, Vivos Voco by Jonathan Harvey. An aural score, analysis and discussion (2018), 008-MA, 009-MP, 0010-MP Vision Edition. 
. ISMN: 979-0-9002315-4-3, 979-0-9002315-5-0.

Conversations (2015), Vision Edition 003-MC, 2015. .

Rhythm to go (2013), Vision Edition 002-MP. 2013. Fourth edition 2016. ISMN 979-0-9002315-1-2.

Jonathan Harvey's Bhakti for chamber ensemble and electronics (2001), Edwin Mellen Press, Studies in History and Interpretation of Music. 
;  * mellenpress

Formal Strategies in Composition. PhD Thesis, City University, London, 1994.

Articles and Papers:

Introduction to ‘Images of the mind' (1997). Paper given at the 1997 KlangArt International Congress ‘New Music & Technology’ in Osnabrück, Germany. Published in ‘Musik und Neue Technologie 3, Musik im virtuellen Raum’ (edited by Bernd Enders), Universitätsverlag Rasch, Osnabrück (2000). .

Conceptual models of interaction: towards a perceptual analysis of interactive composition (1997-8)
Paper given at the 1997 Sonic Arts Network Conference, University of Birmingham, UK, 10–12 January 1998. Published in the Seamus Journal, USA, Vol. XIV no. 1, Summer 1999. SEAMUS, Sonic Arts Network

Perceptual Abstraction and Electroacoustic Composition (1998)
Paper given at the 1998 Seamus Conference, Dartmouth College, NH, USA, 16–18 April 1998 (1997–98). Published in the Seamus Journal, USA, Vol. XIII, No. 2, Fall 1998. SEAMUS

Listening: towards a new awareness of a neglected skill (1997)
Paper for the Stockholm Hey Listen! International Conference on Acoustic Ecology, 9–13 June 1998
Published by the Royal Swedish Academy of Music, June 1998.

Which Global Music? (1999)
Paper given at the 1999 Klangart Congress, Osnabrueck, Germany, June 1999.
Published in ‘Musik und Neue Technologie 4’ (edited by Bernd Enders), Epos music Universitätsverlag Osnabrück (2003). ,  epos music publisher 
read article

The lesson of freedom: Remembering Luc Ferrari (2005)
Published in 'Soundscape - The Journal of Acoustic Ecology', Vol. 6, No. 1, Spring/Summer 2005. ISSN 1607-3304 Soundscape

References
Breathing Silence. An interview with John Palmer. By Cristina Scuderi, 2011. Musica/Tecnologia Journal, Vol. 5, 2011, Firenze University Press. ISSN 1974-0042.

The Ambiguity of Sounds. Composer and pianist John Palmer. By Christian Peter Meier. Luzerner Zeitung, 25.1.1993. In German.

Intervista a John Palmer. By Lia De Pra Cavalleri. Verifiche, Swiss Journal of culture and politics in education, April 2003. In Italian. .

Interview in Composition Today'. By Christian Morris, 2014.

External links
 
 Composers Edition
 Vision Edition

1959 births
Living people
Alumni of City, University of London
20th-century classical composers
21st-century classical composers
English classical composers
Academics of the University of Hertfordshire
Academic staff of the State University of Music and Performing Arts Stuttgart
English male classical composers
20th-century English composers
20th-century British male musicians
20th-century British musicians
21st-century British male musicians